During development of the heart, the orifice of the sinus venosus lies obliquely, and is guarded by two valves, the right and left venous valves; above the opening these unite with each other and are continuous with a fold named the septum spurium.

References 

Embryology of cardiovascular system